S. neglecta may refer to:
 Scorpaena neglecta, a marine fish species in the genus Scorpaena
 Serapias neglecta, an orchid species endemic to southern Europe
 Sitta neglecta, the chestnut-bellied nuthatch, a bird species
 Sturnella neglecta, the western meadowlark, a medium-sized icterid bird species

Synonyms
 Schinia neglecta, a synonym for Schinia diffusa, a moth species found in North America
 Sobralia neglecta, a synonym for Sobralia decora, the beautiful sobralia, an orchid species

See also
 Neglecta (disambiguation)